Nostera is a genus of spiders in the family Zodariidae. It was first described in 1991 by Jocqué. , it contains 4 Australian species.

References

Zodariidae
Araneomorphae genera
Spiders of Australia